Emerson dos Santos da Silva (born 3 May 1983), simply known as Emerson, is a Brazilian footballer who plays for Juventude as a central defender.

Club career
Born in Taguatinga, Distrito Federal, Emerson was a Gama youth graduate. After making his senior debut in 2002, he moved to São Caetano in 2005. In 2006, he was in Guarani, when in the middle of that year he went to Flamengo. Having stayed one month at Flamengo, Emerson ended up finishing that year as player Veranópolis. In 2007, around May, replaced by the Veranópolis Fortress where he remained until the end of the season.

Began the year 2008 in Sertãozinho, however, two months later, came to rescind his contract with the club in order to go play in Avaí Futebol Clube which became one of the highlights of the team in winning access The series in the Campeonato Brasileiro Serie B 2008.

In 2009, Emerson had great prominence along with the best Avai in a campaign of Santa Catarina a club in Serie A Brazilian Championship, finishing in sixth place with 57 points.

Records
Emerson, who made his debut at Avaí on March 5, 2008 in an international friendly before the selection of Jamaica in the Avaí won 2-0, reached a staggering 100 games for the club on February 21, 2010 when Avaí tied for the 1-1 with Joinville in Joinville.

In 2011 he was summoned by national team coach Mano Menezes for the 2nd match against Argentina for that year's Superclasico de las Américas, due to take place in October in the Mangueirão Stadium, in Belém. However he did not enter the field of play during that match, an eventual 2-0 win in aggregate for the Brazilians.

Career statistics
(Correct )

Honours
Flamengo
Copa do Brasil: 2006 

Avaí
Campeonato Catarinense: 2009, 2010

Coritiba
Campeonato Paranaense: 2011, 2012

Individual
Best defender Campeonato Catarinense: 2009, 2010

References

External links
Goal.com profile 

1983 births
Living people
Sportspeople from Federal District (Brazil)
Brazilian footballers
Association football defenders
Campeonato Brasileiro Série A players
Campeonato Brasileiro Série B players
Sociedade Esportiva do Gama players
Associação Desportiva São Caetano players
Guarani FC players
CR Flamengo footballers
Fortaleza Esporte Clube players
Sertãozinho Futebol Clube players
Avaí FC players
Coritiba Foot Ball Club players
Clube Atlético Mineiro players
Botafogo de Futebol e Regatas players